The Ganap Party was a Filipino political party that grew from the Sakdalista movement. Benigno Ramos, who served as its leader, was also the founder of the Sakdalista movement. The party took its name from the Tagalog word , which means "complete".

Inception
Sakdal party leader Benigno Ramos returned to the Philippines in 1938, after three years in self-imposed Japanese exile. Anxious to regroup after the failed May uprising, he formed Ganap. It was therefore not surprising that the party was pro-Japan in outlook and saw an alliance with them as the road to independence. Ramos named the party Ganap because he was anxious to kickstart their election campaign. Their propaganda was so rabidly pro-Japanese and anti-American that Ramos was imprisoned on charges of swindling.
Ganap drew its support base from the old Sakdal members, the disgruntled peasant class.
The party was not without internal dissent, though, as opponents of Benigno Ramos remained in the old Sakdal Party, claiming that Ramos had become a Nacionalista turncoat and a puppet of Quezon.

The coming of Japan
Ganap was able to organise and they were one of only three parties allowed to stand in the 1941 election, when Manuel L. Quezon sought re-election. The party's main area of support was the Bulacan-Southern Luzon area, where the major land estates were located. As the party gained strength, membership spread to other provinces, such as La Union and Pangasinan.

The Pacific theater of the World War II was opened on December 8, 1941 (Philippine time), with the bombing of Pearl Harbor. After that mission, Japanese planes proceeded to bomb targets in Davao. By Christmas, the Japanese forces had landed on Philippine soil. Among the invaders was the pro-Japanese Katipunan general Artemio Ricarte. In early April 1942, the Japanese liberated Ramos from his imprisonment, without forgetting to mobilize Ganap support for the Japanese.

Role in the Japanese occupation
Ganap saw the Japanese as saviors of the Philippines, and its members readily collaborated with them during the occupation of the islands. Many Ganap members were recruited into the Yoin, or United Nippon, an organisation dedicated to performing auxiliary and menial duties for the Japanese expeditionary force.

Other Ganap members were absorbed by the Japanese Army, and were issued weapons. Widespread abuse of these duties and powers was reported, and guerrilla outfits retaliated by harassing Ganap members and their families. In return, the Ganap members would begin sending "Intelligence scouts" into the enemy guerrilla units and their families. If proven that they were anti-Japanese or have killed a fellow Ganap member, these outfits would be rooted out and assassinated.

The Nacionalista Party clique, led by then-President José P. Laurel and former Philippine Executive Commission Chairman Jorge B. Vargas, became worried over the growing power of the Ganap Party. Ganap was therefore sidelined when the occupiers decreed the creation of KALIBAPI into which they were merged. Although the party was a constituent of KALIBAPI, Ganap never exercised real influence within the new grouping, partly at the suggestion of Laurel and Vargas. Many of the original party followers would go on to form the basis of the militia group Makapili, which the Japanese founded in November 1944.

References

External links
Article on the Philippines during World War II
Footage of a Ganap Party rally 

Defunct political parties in the Philippines
Independence movements
Military history of the Philippines during World War II
Organizations disestablished in 1942
Political parties established in 1939
1939 establishments in the Philippines
Paramilitary organizations based in the Philippines